Miss Universe Bulgaria (‘‘Bulgarian: Мис Вселена България’’; ‘‘English: Miss Universe Bulgaria’’) is a national beauty pageant in the Bulgaria that selects Bulgarian representatives to compete in two of the Big Four international beauty pageants: Miss World and Miss Universe and selects five other titleholders to participate in minor international pageants such as Miss Grand International, Miss Asia Pacific, Top Model of the World, Miss Tourism International and Miss Model of the World.

Miss Universe Bulgaria holds an annual pageant to identify young Bulgarian women who exemplify beauty, talent, intelligence and compassion.

Owners
At the moment the license for the contests is property of Fashion Agency “BokStarModels”.

Titleholders

The winner of Miss Universe Bulgaria represents Bulgaria at the Miss Universe from 1991. On occasion, when the winner does not qualify (due to age) for either contest, a runner-up is sent.

See also
 Miss World Bulgaria
 Miss Universe
 Miss Bulgaria

References

External links

Beauty pageants in Bulgaria
1920s establishments in Bulgaria
1990 establishments in Bulgaria
Bulgarian awards
Bulgaria